First Snow (초설 – Choseol) is a 1958 South Korean film directed by Kim Ki-young.

Plot
A melodrama about refugees existing on the black market surrounding the Yongsan U.S. army base after the Korean War.

Cast
Kim Ji-mee
Kim Seung-ho
Park Am
Choi Sam
Choi Nam-hyun
Na Ae-sim
Ahn Sung-ki

Bibliography

References

External links

1950s Korean-language films
South Korean drama films
Films directed by Kim Ki-young